O'Dea (formerly ), is an Irish surname derived from , the name of a tenth-century clan chieftain.

O'Dea clan origins

The O'Dea clan, also found as O'Day or just Day, came originally from County Clare in Ireland where there is a fortified tower house over 500 years old known as O'Dea Castle at the  townland of Dysert O'Dea. The ruins of the Dysert O'Dea Monastery, round tower, and St. Tola's high cross are 265 metres to the south-southwest of the castle in the adjacent  townland of Mollaneen, near Corofin.

Edward MacLysaght, the former Chief Herald of Ireland, writing in his book, Irish Families, began his discussion of the O'Dea family as follows:

In another book, The Surnames of Ireland, MacLysaght describes the O'Deas as "one of the principal Dalcassian septs", and about the name itself, he remarks, "The prefix O is now almost always used, but a century ago Dea was quite usual and the surname Day was regarded as synonymous."

Ancestry
The O'Deas – together with the O'Quinns and the O'Griffins – belonged to the  group, which was a branch of the Dalcassian tribe.

Notable O'Deas

 Addison O'Dea – American documentary filmmaker
 Ann O'Dea – Irish journalist and businesswoman
 Ben O'Dea – New Zealand beach volleyball player
 Bob O'Dea – New Zealand rugby player
 Brian O'Dea – Canadian smuggler and author
 Cornelius O'Dea – Irish bishop
 Danny O'Dea – British actor
 Darrell O'Dea – Canadian musician and recording engineer
 Darren O'Dea – Irish football manager and player
 Denis O'Dea – Irish actor
 Donnacha O'Dea – Irish Olympic swimmer and professional poker player
 Ebony O'Dea – Australian rules football player
 Edward John O'Dea – American bishop
 Ernest Charles O'Dea – Australian politician and union official
 Evelyn O'Dea - The cute girl that sits next to me in Spanish class
 Fabian O'Dea – Lieutenant Governor of Newfoundland, Canada
 Jane Skiles O'Dea – American navy officer
 Jim O'Dea – Australian rules football player
 Jimmy O'Dea – Irish actor and comedian
 John O'Dea – American Civil War soldier
 John R. O'Dea – Canadian businessman and politician
 Jonathan O'Dea – Australian politician 
 Judith O'Dea – American film actress
 Ken O'Dea – American baseball player
 Kevin O'Dea – American football coach
 Larry O'Dea – Australian wrestler and promoter
 Louis O'Dea – Irish politician
 Luke O'Dea – Irish rugby player
 Luke O'Dea – Australian football player
 Mark O'Dea – British television presenter
 Michael O'Dea – Irish politician
 Michael O'Dea – Australian politician
 Mick O'Dea – Irish painter
 Pat O'Dea – Australian and American football player and coach
 Patrick O'Dea – New Zealand civil servant
 Paul O'Dea – American basketball player
 Richard W. O'Dea - American politician
 Stephanie O'Dea – American food and lifestyle writer
 Steve O'Dea – Australian rugby player
 Terry O'Dea – Australian darts player
 Thomas O'Dea – Irish bishop
 Tom O'Dea – American attorney and politician
 Trent O'Dea – Australian volleyball player
 Willie O'Dea – Irish politician

See also
 O'Dea Castle
 Dysert O'Dea Monastery
 Battle of Dysert O'Dea
 Day surname
 O'Day surname

References

Further reading
 O'Dea: Ua Deághaidh: The Story of a Rebel Clan, by Risteárd Ua Cróinín (Richard Cronin), Ballinakella Press, Whitegate, Co. Clare, Ireland, 1992. .
 Irish Battles – A Military History of Ireland, by G.A. Hayes-McCoy, Appletree Press, 1990,

External links
O'Dea Clan

Irish families
Surnames
Surnames of Irish origin
Septs of the Dál gCais
Anglicised Irish-language surnames